Mattias Wennerberg (born August 6, 1981 in Vilhelmina, Sweden) is a forward for the Sundsvall hockey team in the Swedish division-1 league.

Playing career 
The Chicago Blackhawks selected Wennerberg on June 26, 1999 as their sixth draft choice (194th overall). He was picked in the seventh round of the nine-round 1999 NHL Entry Draft.

References

External links 
 
 
  

1981 births
Living people
Chicago Blackhawks draft picks
Swedish ice hockey forwards
Modo Hockey players
Timrå IK players
IF Björklöven players
People from Vilhelmina Municipality
Sportspeople from Västerbotten County